40 Looks Good on You is a 2019 Ghanaian film directed by Pascal Amanfo.

Synopsis 
Five friends Stacy, Yaaba, Mawusi,  Araaba, Ruth who met at the university made a promise to themselves that by age forty they should have achieved everything in life, but things did not seem to go on well for them as the story begins to unfold.

Cast 
 Stephanie Benson
 Roselyn Ngissah
 Selassie Ibrahim
 Uche Jumbo
 Shaffy Bello
 Frederick Leonard
 Eddy Watson
 John Dumelo

References 

Ghanaian drama films
2019 drama films
2019 films
2010s English-language films
English-language Ghanaian films